Balitora annamitica is a species of hill-stream loach from the Mekong River Basin in Cambodia, Thailand, and Laos, and possibly Vietnam. It might be more than one species.

Balitora annamitica grow to  TL. It occurs in rapids and stretches of rivers with fast flow. It is locally common and present in subsistence fisheries.

References

A
Fish of the Mekong Basin
Fish of Cambodia
Fish of Laos
Fish of Thailand
Fish described in 1988